There are many lakes named Rocky Lake in Nova Scotia, Canada.

Annapolis County
 Rocky Lake at 
 Rocky Lake at

Municipalite Argyle Municipality
 Rocky Lake at

Cape Breton Regional Municipality
 Rocky Lake at

Municipality of Clare
 Rocky Lake at

Municipality of the District of Chester
 Rocky Lake at 
 Rocky Lake at 
 Rocky Lake at

Colchester County
 Rocky Lake at

Guysborough County
 Rocky Lake at  
 Rocky Lake at 
 Rocky Lake at 
 Rocky Lake at 
 Rocky Lake at 
 Rocky Lake at 
 Rocky Lake at 
 Rocky Lake at 
 Rocky Lake at 
 Rocky Lake at 
 Rocky Lakes at 
 Rocky Lakes at

Municipality of East Hants
 Rocky Lake at 
 Rocky Lake at

Halifax Regional Municipality
 Rocky Lake at 
 Rocky Lake at
 Rocky Lake at
 Rocky Lake at 
 Rocky Lake at 
 Rocky Lake at 
 Rocky Lake at 
 Rocky Lake at 
 Rocky Lake at 
 Rocky Lake at
 Rocky Lake at
 Rocky Lake at
 Rocky Lake at
 Rocky Lake at
 Rocky Lake at
 Rocky Lake at
 Rocky Lake at
 Rocky Lake at
 Rocky Lake at
 Rocky Lake at in Bedford
 Rocky Lake at

Lunenburg County
 Rocky Lake at 
 Rocky Lake at 
 Rocky Lake at 
 Rocky Lake at 
 Rocky Lake at

Richmond County
 Rocky Lake at

Municipality of the District of St. Mary's
 Rocky Lake at 
 Rocky Lake at 
 Rocky Lake at 
 Rocky Lake at

See also

Geography of Nova Scotia

References
 Geographical Names Board of Canada
 Explore HRM
 Nova Scotia Placenames

Lakes of Nova Scotia
Lakes, Rocky Lake